Fayetteville Municipal Airport may refer to:

 Fayetteville Municipal Airport (Arkansas), also known as Drake Field, in Fayetteville, Arkansas, United States (FAA: FYV)
 Fayetteville Municipal Airport (North Carolina), now known as Fayetteville Regional Airport, in Fayetteville, North Carolina, United States (FAA: FAY)
 Fayetteville Municipal Airport (Tennessee) in Fayetteville, Tennessee, United States (FAA: FYM)

See also
 Fayette County Airport (disambiguation)